Pulpudeva Glacier is the  long and  wide glacier in Sullivan Heights, Sentinel Range in Ellsworth Mountains, Antarctica.  It is draining the area northeast of Nebeska Peak, north of Johnson Col and northwest of Mount Farrell, flowing northwards west of Mount Levack, and (together with Crosswell and Patton Glaciers) joining Ellen Glacier northwest of Mamarchev Peak and southeast of Mount Jumper.

The glacier is named after the ancient Thracian town of Pulpudeva in Southern Bulgaria.

Location
US mapping in 1961, updated in 1988.

See also
 List of glaciers in the Antarctic
 Glaciology

Maps
 Vinson Massif.  Scale 1:250 000 topographic map.  Reston, Virginia: US Geological Survey, 1988.
 Antarctic Digital Database (ADD). Scale 1:250000 topographic map of Antarctica. Scientific Committee on Antarctic Research (SCAR). Since 1993, regularly updated.

References
 Pulpudeva Glacier - SCAR Composite Antarctic Gazetteer
 Bulgarian Antarctic Gazetteer. Antarctic Place-names Commission. (details in Bulgarian, basic data in English)

External links
 Pulpudeva Glacier. Copernix satellite image

Glaciers of Ellsworth Land
Bulgaria and the Antarctic